František Jirásek (died 10 May 1941) was a Czech footballer who played as a midfielder.

Club career
During his playing career, Jirásek played for Smíchov.

International career
On 1 April 1906, Jirásek made his debut for Bohemia in Bohemia's second game, starting in a 1–1 draw against Hungary. Jirásek would later make one final appearance for Bohemia on 7 April 1907.

Post-playing career
Following his playing career, Jirásek went into breeding livestock. Before his death in 1941, Jirásek was also honorary chairman of SK Libeň.

Notes

References

Date of birth unknown
1941 deaths
Association football midfielders
Czech footballers
Czechoslovak footballers
Bohemia international footballers
Footballers from Prague